Virgin Music Label & Artist Services is a music distributor of independent artists and record labels, owned by Universal Music Group. The subsidiary focuses on the distribution of new or emerging partners. The company is currently part of Virgin Music Group.

The digital music and network company INgrooves (including the independent label distributor Fontana Distribution) was acquired by Universal in 2019, with Fontana being folded into Virgin.

In September 2022, Universal Music Group announced the launch of Virgin Music Group which consist of Ingrooves, Virgin Music Label & Artist Services, and mtheory Artist Partnerships.

References

External links 
 Virgin Music Label & Artist Services Homepage

American record labels
Record label distributors
Labels distributed by Universal Music Group
1983 establishments in California
Record labels established in 1983
Companies based in California
Companies based in Los Angeles County, California
Companies based in Los Angeles
EMI
Virgin Records